The 2nd Tennessee Heavy Artillery Regiment (African Descent) was an artillery regiment that served in the Union Army during the American Civil War.  The regiment was also known as 2nd West Tennessee Heavy Artillery Regiment (African Descent).

Service
The 2nd Tennessee Heavy Artillery (African Descent) was organized at Columbus, Kentucky and mustered in for three years under the command of Colonel Charles H. Adams.  As was custom at the time, the regiment was designated the 2nd Tennessee (Colored) Heavy Artillery.  The first recruits were assigned to Companies A, B, and C in June 1863, but the rest of the companies were not fully enrolled and mustered until November 1863.  The regiment consisted of nine companies of artillery.

The regiment was attached to District of Columbus, Kentucky, 6th Division, XVI Corps, Department of the Tennessee, to April 1864.

The 2nd Tennessee Heavy Artillery (African Descent) ceased to exist on April 26, 1864, to 4th United States Colored Heavy Artillery Regiment.

Detailed service
During its brief existence, the regiment performed post and garrison duty at Union City, Tennessee, and Columbus, Kentucky, until April 1864

Commanders
 Colonel Charles H. Adams

See also

 List of Tennessee Civil War units
 Tennessee in the Civil War

References
 Dyer, Frederick H.  A Compendium of the War of the Rebellion (Des Moines, IA:  Dyer Pub. Co.), 1908.
Attribution

External links
 Brief unit history, including officers' names, regimental strengths, etc.

Military units and formations established in 1863
Military units and formations disestablished in 1864
Units and formations of the Union Army from Tennessee
1865 disestablishments in Tennessee
Tennessee Heavy Artillery, 002
Artillery units and formations of the American Civil War
1863 establishments in Kentucky